"Boyz-n-the-Hood" is the debut single by Eazy-E, then leader of a new rap group, N.W.A. Released in March 1987, the single was a local hit, reissued, by year's end, on N.W.A's EP titled N.W.A. and on the unauthorized compilation album N.W.A. and the Posse.

Background
Eric Wright, who founded Ruthless Records in 1986, had tasked the Ruthless songcrafting team—record producer Dr. Dre, aided by DJ Yella and Arabian Prince, and ghostwriter Ice Cube—to draft the song in line with Wright's vision. But once a rap group signed from New York City rejected it, Wright rapped it himself, dubbed Eazy-E. In 1988, having gained rapper MC Ren, N.W.A released its official debut album, Straight Outta Compton.

While N.W.A's Straight Outta Compton album spurred the Los Angeles area's hip hop to drop electro and rapidly go hardcore, the rappers still called it "reality rap", whereas news media would soon call it "gangsta rap". Meanwhile, also in 1988, a "Boyz-n-the-Hood" remix arrived on an N.W.A companion album cheekier, Eazy's debut album Eazy-Duz-It. After N.W.A's disbanding in 1991, Eazy's EP titled It's On (Dr. Dre) 187um Killa, released in 1993, brings another remix, "Boyz N tha Hood (G-Mix)".

Yet in 1991, the title became iconic instead through director John Singleton, who borrowed this song's title for his film Boyz n the Hood. The song, rather, took altogether nearly 30 years to hit the pop chart. Released in August 2015, the film Straight Outta Compton had renewed interest in N.W.A when, on September 5, "Boyz-n-the-Hood" debuted on the Billboard Hot 100. That week, at #50, it was the chart's third-highest debut, behind the 1988 title track "Straight Outta Compton" (the other song being "Hit the Quan"), originally too incendiary for wide radio play.

Production
In 1986, in Compton, a city in Los Angeles county, Eric Wright, a local drug dealer, founded Ruthless Records via industry knowledge and connections of music manager Jerry Heller and via musical talent and recording facilities brought by Dr. Dre and Arabian Prince, two DJs, record producers, and recording artists successful locally. The team drew Ice Cube, member of the local rap trio C.I.A., to ghostwrite lyrics. In early 1987, Wright invited to the Audio Achievements recording studio, in nearby city Torrance, the rap group H.B.O., or Home Boys Only, signed from New York City, to record the Ruthless songcrafting team's song "Boyz-n-the-Hood".

With a rough instrumental draft already recorded by Dr. Dre, assisted by DJ Yella and Arabian Prince, H.B.O., appraising the lyrics still on paper, rejected the song and walked out. Left sitting in the studio without Ice Cube present to start with, Dre and Yella encouraged Wright to rap the song himself. To get each line rapped in timing with its bar, they recorded line by line across two days, recalls DJ Yella. Still, the first-time rapper, dubbed Eazy-E, brought a distinctive voice and persona. As released, the single musically samples rap group Whodini's song "I'm a Ho". And it vocally samples rap group the Beastie Boys' song "Hold It, Now Hit It" as well as two soul classics, Jean Knight's song "Mr. Big Stuff" and, in closing, The Staple Singers' song "I'll Take You There".

Content 
In the "Boyz-n-the-Hood" lyrics, Eazy-E is the protagonist and tells a story of an ordinary day “in the hood.”  The song details E seeing a friend Kilo G after Kilo has stolen a car.  Kilo brags to E about committing grand theft auto. E then relates a story of a prior friend, JD who became addicted to crack and attempted to steal E's car radio.  E chases JD to call a truce, but JD pulls a .22 calibre pistol on E.  Unbeknownst to JD, E has a 12 gauge and he ends up killing JD.  Eazy, "bored as hell", went to a spot where his friends gather.  There E drinks alcohol and then goes to get his girlfriend for sex.  At her home, they get into an altercation and E slaps his girlfriend.  Her father witnesses this and jumps up yelling at E.  E then hits her father knocking him unconscious.

Later, Eazy wrecked his own car and as he was walking witnessed the arrest of Kilo G.  E attempted to bail Kilo out, but bail was denied due to a riot Kilo started while he was in lock up.  At Kilo's trial, Kilo G was given a six-year sentence for his crimes as this was Kilo's fourth offense. Probably anticipating a long jail sentence, Kilo had planned to have his girlfriend Suzy help him to escape.  At the code word “fire” which Kilo yelled out, Suzy entered the court room with a sub machine Uzi.  The plan did not work and Suzy was shot.   Kilo and Suzy were then both charged with attempted murder.

Versions
The original version of the song, which was released on 1987's N.W.A. and the Posse contained only the five verses, starting with the line 'Cruisin down the street in my six-fo'. Slight lyric changes are also present in the album version.

The remix version, which was released on Eazy-E's 1988 debut album Eazy-Duz-It, contains a prologue that has Eazy-E describing playing "Gangsta Gangsta", a track from N.W.A's 1988 album Straight Outta Compton, then announcing he will be playing his own song, which is in fact the rest of the song "Boyz-n-the-Hood", and the song continues.

Both the original version and the remix versions of "Boyz-n-the-Hood" appear on the 1989 12" maxi-single. They are featured on side A, while the original and remixed versions of "Dopeman" appear on side B.

The song was played on the Up In Smoke Tour. Dr. Dre played this song as a tribute to Eazy-E, with the crowd singing the chorus.

Critical reception and legacy
Jeff Chang describes "Boyz-n-the-Hood" as "an anthem for the fatherless, brotherless, state-assaulted, heavily armed West Coast urban youth" and Eazy-E's rap style as "a deadpan singsong...perhaps as much a result of self-conscious nervousness as hardcore fronting."

Rolling Stone ranks the song as among the 20 greatest West Coast rap songs that preceded N.W.A's Straight Outta Compton. Critic David Drake commented: "It was a day-in-the-life record that was less concerned with commentary or critique than simply conveying a lifestyle." Also writing for Rolling Stone, Brian Hiatt compares the subject matter in "Boyz-n-the-Hood" to "6 in the Mornin'" by Ice-T and "P.S.K. What Does It Mean?" by Schoolly D.

Cover versions
Red Hot Chili Peppers often covered the song live as an intro jam to their own song, "Special Secret Song Inside" on their 1989-90 Mother's Milk tour.

In 2004, the song was re-imagined and sampled by rapper Jim Jones on his debut album On My Way to Church. His version was called "Certified Gangstas", and featured Bezel and Cam'ron.

Besides Jim Jones' song there have been many remakes, most notably a cover by alternative rock band Dynamite Hack, which hit #12 on the Billboard Modern Rock Tracks in 2000. The last line of this version, "Punk ass trippin in the dead of night", is sung to the tune of The Beatles' "Blackbird": "Blackbird singing in the dead of night". However, some of the words, as well as the "Blackbird" melody, were altered for the music video version of the song.

Hispanic rap group Brownside did a remake to the song called "Vatos in the Barrio". The instrumental of the original is remade, and the lyrics are slightly different but keep the main structure of the Eazy-E version.

Underground Memphis rapper Koopsta Knicca of Three 6 Mafia made his own version called "Back in da Hood".

Shwayze uses one of the lines from "Boyz-n-the-Hood" in his song "Lost My Mind" on his album Shwayze; the line he uses is "Woke up at about noon just thought that I had to be in Compton Soon".

It is sampled in "Front Back" by UGK (as well as its remix by T.I.), "My 64" by Mike Jones (featuring Bun B, Snoop Dogg and Lil' Eazy-E), "Pojat On Huudeilla" by Eurocrack, "Them Boys Down South" by Big Chance.

Track 8 (Disc 2) on DJ Screw's album "The Legend" has the same song style as Boyz-n-the-Hood.

Yelawolf made a song called "Boyz-n-the-Woodz" for his 2008 mixtape, Ball of Flames: the Ballad of Slick Rick E. Bobby. The song interpolates the original chorus but is made to have a "white trash" feel.

American rapper Megan Thee Stallion sampled the song in her 2020 single "Girls in the Hood".

Charts

Certifications

References

1987 songs
1987 debut singles
Eazy-E songs
N.W.A songs
Ruthless Records singles
Songs written by Ice Cube
Song recordings produced by Dr. Dre